The Dolph Briscoe Jr. Library is the central library of the University of Texas Health Science Center at San Antonio library system. It is located in South Texas Medical Center in San Antonio, Texas, US.

The award-winning library was designed by Kell Muñoz Architects. Completed in 1983, it was named in 1985 after Dolph Briscoe.

In 2005, the library was awarded the nation's highest library award for their outreach programs. The award was presented to the library by the first lady, Laura Bush.

Special collections
The library is notable for a rare book collection, the only such repository in south and central Texas. The P.I. Nixon collection is home to
over 5000 rare medical texts dating from the 15th to the early 20th century:
 The Canon of Medicine by Avicenna
 Anatomy of Melancholy by Burton, 1632 edition.
 De Medicina by Celsus, 1481 edition.
 The Micrographia by Robert Hooke
 De Humani Corporis Fabrica by Vesalius, 1543 edition
 Tables of the Skeleton and Muscles of the Human Body by Bernhard Siegfried Albinus, printed 1749
Original copies also exist by Nostradamus, Galen, Mascagni, Hieronymus Brunschwig, Bernardino Genga, and Withering.

References

External links

Treasures of the P.I. Nixon Rare Book Collection Blog
History of Medicine Library Digital Archive

Libraries in San Antonio
University of Texas Health Science Center at San Antonio